Tolpis succulenta is a species of flowering plant in the family Asteraceae native to the Portuguese archipelagos of the Azores and Madeira. It inhabits all islands (excluding the Savage Islands).

Description

Older individuals present a woody base. Its leaves are glabrous and toothed. It has yellow flowers scattered along the stems.

References

Endemic flora of Macaronesia
Flora of the Azores
Flora of Madeira
Endemic flora of Portugal
Cichorieae